The Gibson House Museum is an historic house museum located at 137 Beacon Street in the Back Bay neighborhood of Boston, Massachusetts. It preserves the 1860 Victorian rowhouse occupied by three generations of the Gibson family. The house was one of the first to be built in Back Bay, and has an unparalleled state of preservation that includes wallpaper, textiles, furnishings, and family artifacts and collections. Both the public and service areas of the house exhibit a high degree of preservation, and are viewable on tours. The property was designated a Boston Landmark in 1992 by the Boston Landmarks Commission and a National Historic Landmark in 2001.

History
The widowed Catherine Hammond Gibson purchased the newly filled in land for $3,696 in 1859 in order to move away from Beacon Hill. Edward Clarke Cabot designed the building which was finished by 1860 in the Italian Renaissance style with an exterior of brownstone and red brick.  She passed it on to her son Charles Hammond Gibson.

Charles married Rosamond Warren in 1871 and brought her to live at number 137.  Rosamond was from a very distinguished Boston family and after Catherine's death in 1888 redecorated the house with Japanese wallpapers.

After Charles Hammond Gibson, Jr.,  Catherine Hammond Gibson's grandson, died in 1954, the house became a museum in 1957, and in 2001 was declared a National Historic Landmark.  The Gibson House's landmark status is due to its claim that it is the only Victorian era row house in Boston's Back Bay to maintain the integral relationship between the exterior architectural shell and the original interior plan, with its accompanying decorative schemes.  Its interior is a composite of family furnishings and pieces added to make it more complete.

Museum
The museum hosts public tours and programming including lectures and receptions.

In 2013, Simple Machine Theatre staged a production of The Turn of the Screw on the Museum's Grand Staircase and front hall before an audience seated in the entrance.

To commemorate Charles Hammond Gibson, Jr.'s reputation as a Prohibition-era party host, the Museum hosts an annual Repeal Day Celebration fundraiser, featuring period cocktails.I n

In film 

The 1984 Merchant/Ivory film The Bostonians contains scenes filmed in Rosamund Warren Gibson's bedroom, in the red study, and on the landing at the top of the grand staircase.

A 2018 promotional film for Boston Ballet's production of The Nutcracker features scenes of Clara in the Museum's Music Room and on the Grand Staircase.

In 2018 director Greta Gerwig filmed scenes in the Museum for Little Women. The Museum served as the boarding house residence of Jo March, while the Museum library was depicted as the office of Jo March's publisher.

See also 
 List of National Historic Landmarks in Massachusetts
 National Register of Historic Places listings in northern Boston, Massachusetts

References

External links 
 The Gibson House Museum
 Boston Landmarks Commission The Gibson House Study Report

Houses in Boston
Landmarks in Back Bay, Boston
Historic house museums in Massachusetts
Museums in Boston
National Historic Landmarks in Boston
Houses completed in 1860
Historic district contributing properties in Massachusetts
Houses on the National Register of Historic Places in Suffolk County, Massachusetts
National Register of Historic Places in Boston